Pakistan competed at the 1976 Summer Olympics in Montreal, Canada. The men's hockey team won a bronze medal.

Medalists
Bronze medal won by the hockey team in the men's team competition

Results by event

Athletics

Men's 800 metres

 Mohammad Younus
 Heat 1 round 1; 1:48.50 (→ did not advance)

Men's 1500 metres

 Muhammad Siddique
 Heat 4 round 1; 3:45.59 (→ did not advance)

Boxing

Men's flyweight (51 kg)

 Mohammad Sadiq
 1/32 final; Bye
 1/16 final; Lost to Giovanni Camputaro (ITA) on pts 5:0

Men's middleweight (75 kg)

 Siraj Din
 1/16 final; Beat Nicolas Arredondo (MEX) RSC 3rd rd
 1/8 final; w/o (1/16 final between Pierre Lotti Mwale (ZIM) and Zakaria Amalemba (KEN) not contested)
 1/4 final; Lost to Rufat Riskiev (USSR) KO 2nd rd

Hockey

Men's Team Competition

Pool B

 Defeated  (5-0)
 Defeated  (4-2)
 Defeated  (5-2)

Semifinals

For the 3rd place

 Defeated  (3-2)

Pakistan won the bronze medal

Team Roster

 Abdul Rasheed Jr (captain)
 Islahuddin (vice-captain)
 Saleem Sherwani (gk)
 Qamar Zia (gk)
 Munawwaruz Zaman
 Manzoorul Hasan
 Arshad Mahmood
 Akhtar Rasool
 Iftikhar Syed
 Arshad Chaudhry
 Saleem Nazim
 Hanif Khan
 Shahnaz Sheikh
 Samiullah Khan
 Manzoor Hussain
 Mudassar Asghar

Weightlifting

Men's bantamweight (56 kg)

 Mohammad Manzoor
 Snatch 95.0kg
 Clean and jerk 130.0kg
 Total 225.0kg (finished 11th out of 17)

Men's middleweight (75 kg)

 Mohammad Arshad Malik
 Snatch 122.5kg
 Clean and jerk 160.0kg
 Total 282.5kg (finished 15th out of 15)

Wrestling Freestyle

Men's up to 57 kg

 Allah Ditta
 Round 1; Lost to Joe Corso (USA) on pts 20:8
 Round 2; Lost to Masao Arai (JPN) by fall

Men's up to 90 kg

 Salahuddin
 Round 1; Beat Dashdorj Tserentogtokh (MGL) by fall
 Round 2; Lost to Pawel Kurczewski (POL) by fall
 Round 3; Lost to Keijo Manni (FIN) by fall

References
Official Olympic Reports
International Olympic Committee results database

Nations at the 1976 Summer Olympics
1976 Summer Olympics
1976 in Pakistan